Terry Beeson (born September 19, 1955) is a former American football linebacker. He played in the  National Football League (NFL) for the Seattle Seahawks from 1977 to 1981 and the San Francisco 49ers in 1982. He held the Seahawks record for most tackles in a season with 153 until linebacker Bobby Wagner broke it in 2016. Beeson finished his career in the United States Football League (USFL), playing for the Oklahoma Outlaws in 1984 and Jacksonville Bulls the following year.

Beeson was inducted into the Kansas Sports Hall of Fame in 2015.

References

1955 births
Living people
American football linebackers
Jacksonville Bulls players
Kansas Jayhawks football players
Oklahoma Outlaws players
San Francisco 49ers players
Seattle Seahawks players
People from Coffeyville, Kansas
Players of American football from Kansas